Holtzbrinck Publishing Group is a privately held German company based in Stuttgart which owns publishing companies worldwide. Through Macmillan Publishers, it is one of the Big Five English-language publishing companies.

In 2015, it merged most of its Macmillan Science and Education unit (including Nature Publishing Group) with Springer Science+Business Media, creating the company Springer Nature. Holtzbrinck owns 53% of the combined company.

History
The history of Georg von Holtzbrink's publishing activities during the Nazi years 1933-1945 has been controversial. After World War II, Georg von Holtzbrinck, a former member of the Nazi party, reestablished a group in 1948, beginning as a German book club. In the 1960s, it purchased the German publishing companies Droemer, Kindler, Rowohlt and S. Fischer Verlag. In 1985, it acquired the retail book division of Holt, Rinehart and Winston, naming it the Henry Holt Book Company. One year later, the company acquired Scientific American magazine for $52.6 million. In 1994, it purchased a majority interest in Farrar, Straus & Giroux from retiring Roger W. Straus, Jr. A year later, it purchased a 70% majority interest in The Macmillan Group, and then the remaining shares in 1999.

In March 2006, Holtzbrinck forced Tor Books, which is owned by Holtzbrinck, to stop making its books available as e-books via Baen Ebooks because of concerns regarding the lack of digital rights management (DRM). The policy was later changed and Tor titles became available as DRM-free e-books in 2012. The Tor UK label in Britain (and hence the EU) does the same. The company also received a good deal of attention when it bought the then leading German social networking platform StudiVZ in January 2007.

Holtzbrinck has total annual sales of 2.1 billion euros (as of 2005); 49% of sales are in Germany and 23% in North America. It had 2005 earnings before taxes of 142 million euros, and a total of 14,000 employees.

The current chairman of the group is Stefan von Holtzbrinck. John Sargent is CEO of Macmillan, the company that unites the US-based businesses of the group.

Subsidiaries and imprints

In Germany:
 S. Fischer Verlag
 FISCHER Krüger
 
 FISCHER Scherz
 Rowohlt Verlag
 Kiepenheuer & Witsch (85%)
 Verlagsgruppe Droemer Knaur (50%)
 O.W. Barth
 Die Zeit (50%)

In the United States:
Using the Macmillan name:
 Farrar, Straus and Giroux
Faber & Faber (formerly; ended partnership in 2015)
 Henry Holt and Company
Holt Paperbacks
Metropolitan Books
Times Books
Owl Books
 Palgrave Macmillan
 Picador
 Roaring Brook Press
  Neal Porter Books
 First Second Books
 St. Martin's Press
Thomas Dunne Books
 Tom Doherty Associates
 Tor Books
 Forge Books
 Bedford, Freeman and Worth Publishing Group
 W.H. Freeman
 Bedford-St. Martin's
 Worth Publishers
 Macmillan Learning
 Hayden-McNeil
 Nature Publishing Group
 Scientific American

Using the Audio Renaissance name in Southfield, Michigan:
 Renaissance Media

In the United Kingdom:
 Macmillan Publishers
 Palgrave Macmillan
 Pan Macmillan
 Macmillan
 Pan Books
 Picador
 Macmillan Children's Books
 Campbell Books
 Priddy Books
 Boxtree
 Sidgwick & Jackson
 Macmillan Education
 Springer Nature (53%)
 Digital Science

See also

The Big Five English-language book publishers: Simon & Schuster, Penguin Random House, HarperCollins, Macmillan Publishers, and Hachette
 Springer Nature
 Books in Germany
 Bertelsmann
 Elsevier
 Lagardère Publishing
 McGraw Hill Education
 Pearson plc
 News Corp
 Scholastic Corporation
 Thomson Reuters
 Wiley (publisher)

Notes and references

External links 

 
 

 
Book publishing companies of Germany
Newspaper companies of Germany
Magazine publishing companies of Germany
Multinational publishing companies
Publishing companies established in 1948
1948 establishments in Germany
Mass media in Stuttgart
German companies established in 1948